Hunting Party or The Hunting Party may refer to:

Hunting party, a group of people organized to hunt wild game
Mixed hunting party, a group of hunting birds
 Political parties with a pro-hunting platform such as the French Hunting, Fishing, Nature, Tradition

Film
 The Hunting Party (1971 film), a film directed by Don Medford
 The Hunting Party (2007 film), a film directed by Richard Shepard
 Hunting Party (1959 film), a 1959 West German drama film

TV
 "Hunting Party" (Body of Proof), a 2011 episode from the TV series Body of Proof
 "The Hunting Party" (Lost), a 2006 episode from the TV series Lost
"The Hunting Party" (Dead Zone), an episode from the TV series The Dead Zone

Books
 Hunting Party (novel), a novel by Elizabeth Moon
 The Hunting Party (comics) (Partie de chasse), a graphic novel by Pierre Christin and Enki Bilal
 "The Hunting Party" (Judge Dredd story), a Judge Dredd story

Music
 The Hunting Party (album), the sixth studio album by American rock band Linkin Park
 The Hunting Party (live album), DVD to the sixth studio album by American rock band Linkin Park